Hosta ventricosa, the blue plantain lily, is a species of flowering plant in the family Asparagaceae, native to southeast and south-central China, and introduced to the eastern United States. It reproduces by pseudogamous apomixis.

References

ventricosa
Garden plants of Asia
Endemic flora of China
Flora of South-Central China
Flora of Southeast China
Plants described in 1931